The Last House In The Woods is a 2006 Italian horror film, which was directed by Gabriele Albanesi and stars Daniela Virgilio, Daniele Grasseti and Gennaro Diana.

Plot
A young couple gets beat up by some punks. They are saved by a seemingly nice older couple who take them back to their house for shelter.  While there, the wounded woman begins to realize that some evil things are occurring within the "Last House in the Woods".

Release
The film premiered on 6 October 2006 at Ravenna Nightmare Film Festival. It was distributed only on DVD in the United States by Ghost House Underground, a division of Ghost House Pictures. The Unrated DVD was released on 24 August 2007 and contains different material that isn't included in the theatrical version.

External links

2006 films
Italian horror films
Italian slasher films
2000s Italian-language films
Italian splatter films
2006 horror films
2000s slasher films
Backwoods slasher films
Films about cannibalism
2000s Italian films